Neelapponmaan is a 1975 Indian Malayalam-language film,  directed and produced by Kunchacko. The film stars Prem Nazir, KPAC Lalitha, Adoor Bhasi and Sreelatha Namboothiri in the lead roles. The film has musical score by Salil Chowdhary.

Cast

 Prem Nazir as Ivano
 KPAC Lalitha as Kotha
 Adoor Bhasi as Kutty
 Sreelatha Namboothiri as Kochukalyani
 K. P. Ummer as Dr. Pavithran
 N. Govindankutty as MLA
 Sakunthala as Urmila
 Sumithra as Veluthamma
 Thikkurissy Sukumaran Nair as Sankara Prabhu
 Bahadoor as Paappi
 Alummoodan as Kumaran
 Adoor Pankajam as Akkomma
 Paul Vengola as Kochuraman

Soundtrack

References

External links
 

1975 films
1970s Malayalam-language films
Films scored by Salil Chowdhury